Labyrinth is the fifth studio album from German futurepop band Blutengel. It entered German Top 50 Albums Chart at 36 for a week. The album spawned a popular single, titled "Lucifer." It is also with Ulrike Goldmann, and not Constance Rudert. Lucifer was released as 2 cd's, entitled Purgatory and Blaze.

Track listing

  Hidden Track, appears after 62 tracks of silence & 6:06 of silence on CD.

References

External links
Acharts.US

2004 albums
Blutengel albums